The 2012 H.E. Mahinda Rajapaksa Under-23 International Football Trophy was the first edition of the tournament which took place in Sri Lanka from 3–9 December 2012.

The tournament was won by Maldives, who defeated Pakistan 2–1 in the final.

Hosts
Sri Lanka were the hosts of the tournament as this is organised by the Ministry of Sports in association with the Football Federation of Sri Lanka.

Venue

Participated nations
  – Host

Group stage
All times are Sri Lanka Time (SLST) – UTC+05:30

Final

Winner

Goalscorers
2 goals
 Hassan Adhuham
 Assadhulla Abdulla

1 goal
 Saeed Ahmed
 Ahmed Imaaz
 Eranda Prasad
 Touhidul Alam
 Rilwan Waheed

1 own goal
 Moosa Yaamin (playing against Pakistan in the final)

References

2012 in Asian football
2012
2012–13 in Sri Lankan football
2012 in Maldivian football
2012 in Bangladeshi football
2012–13 in Pakistani football